xmove is a computer program that allows the movement of X Window System applications between different displays and the persistence of X applications across X server restarts. It solves a problem in the design of X, where an X client (an X application) is tied to the X server (X display) it was started on for its lifetime. Also, if the X server is shut down, the client application is forced to stop running.

xmove lets the client disconnect from its current X server, and connect to a new one, at any time. The transition is completely transparent to the client. xmove works by acting as a proxy between the client and server. It is a "pseudoserver" which stores enough server state so that clients can connect to a new server without being disrupted.

See also 

 xpra — a more recent tool which is similar to xmove
 guievict — a system for checkpointing and migrating the GUI of an X window application
 the lbxproxy tool, which allows disconnecting and reconnecting

References

External links 
 Xmove, IMproved (XIMove) — by Mark C. Ballew

X Window programs
Software using the MIT license
Proxy servers
X servers
Remote desktop
1997 software